Tazraq may refer to:
 Tazraq, Afghanistan
 Tazraq, Iran